Cypoides chinensis is a species of moth of the family Sphingidae first described by Walter Rothschild and Karl Jordan in 1903.

Distribution 
It is known from southern China and Taiwan, south to mountainous northern Vietnam and north-eastern Thailand.

Description 
The wingspan is 38–43 mm. It is similar to Cypa decolor, but the forewings are broader and the hindwing upperside a rusty red and brighter in colour.

Biology 
There is one generation per year in Hong Kong with adults on wing from January to March. However, it appears that in some years some adults will appear on the wing again in September and October. There are two generations per year in the northern part of the range. In Thailand, adults have been recorded in July and August during the wet season

The larvae have been recorded feeding on Liquidambar formosana in Guangdong and Hong Kong and Broussonetia papyrifera and Quercus species in other areas of China.

References

Smerinthini
Moths described in 1903